Michelle Campi (born July 29, 1976) is an American artistic gymnast. As a member of the U.S. Women's Gymnastics team at the 1991 World Artistic Gymnastics Championships, she won a silver medal in the team competition. Campi was the alternate for the U.S. women's team at the 1992 Olympic Games in Barcelona.

Campi is also an artist and has work on display with the Art of the Olympians.

References

External links 
 Michella Campi on Gymn.ca
  (USA Gymnastics channel)

1976 births
American female artistic gymnasts
Living people
Medalists at the World Artistic Gymnastics Championships
U.S. women's national team gymnasts
21st-century American women